Sittig is a surname. Notable people with the surname include:

Dale Sittig (born 1940), American businessman and politician
Dean F. Sittig (born 1961), American biomedical informatician
Eugene A. Sittig (1847–1907), American publisher and politician
John Sittig (1905–1984), American middle-distance runner
Lynne Cossman also known as Jeralynn Sittig Cossman, American academic
Stefan Sittig (born 1972), American theatre director and choreographer